Ghattas Hazim (born 1963, in Mhardeh, Syria) is a Greek Orthodox (Eastern Orthodox) hierarch. Since 2014, he serves as Metropolitan of Baghdad, Kuwait and Dependencies, under the jurisdiction of Greek Orthodox Patriarchate of Antioch and All the East.

Biography
Metropolitan Ghattas Hazim was born in 1963, in Mhardeh, Syria. He earned a bachelor's degree in Theology from the St. John of Damascus Institute of Theology in 1987. He was ordained a Deacon in the Archdiocese of Hama in 1989, and a priest in 1990. He was elevated to the rank of Archimandrite and appointed Vicar to the Metropolitan of Hama. He served as the Abbot of the Monastery of St. George in Mhardeh. During this time, he oversaw the Christian Education Department in the Archdiocese of Hama. In 1999, he was consecrated by his uncle, the late Patriarch Ignatius IV of Antioch as Bishop of Quarah. He moved to Damascus and was appointed Patriarchal Vicar.

In October 2010, he appointed dean of the St. John of Damascus Institute of Theology and abbot of the Our Lady of Balamand Patriarchal Monastery in northern Lebanon. In September 2013, he was dismissed from the post of Dean, while remaining the abbot of the Balamand monastery until his election to Baghdad see

On 7 October 2014, after the retirement of long serving (since 1969) Metropolitan Constantine Papastephanou, the Holy Synod of Antioch elected  bishop Ghattas Hazim as new "Metropolitan of Baghdad, Kuwait and Dependencies". Since northern parts of his new diocese (specially Iraq) were severely affected by devastating wars and conflicts during past two decades, upon arriving in Baghdad he was faced with many problems, starting from the fact that over 90% of the Eastern Orthodox Christians in the country have been displaced due to the security chaos which has prevailed there for the past generation. Because of that, his official seat remains in Baghdad, but administrative headquarters of the Archdiocese are still located in Kuwait.

See also
 Eastern Orthodoxy in Iraq
 Christianity in Iraq
 Persecution of Christians in Iraq
 Arab Christians
 Christianity in Kuwait
 Christianity in Oman
 Christianity in Eastern Arabia

References

1963 births
People from Hama Governorate
Greek Orthodox Christians from Syria
Bishops of the Greek Orthodox Church of Antioch
Eastern Orthodoxy in Iraq
Eastern Orthodoxy in Kuwait
20th-century Eastern Orthodox bishops
21st-century Eastern Orthodox bishops
Living people
People from Bethlehem